Teenage Mutant Ninja Turtles is a 1991 pinball machine designed by Joe Kaminkow and Ed Cebula. It is based on the comic book characters of the same name, and was preceded by a related TV series and feature film. The game uses the action figures made by Playmates Toys as decoration for the table.  A second Teenage Mutant Ninja Turtles pinball machine was released by Stern Pinball in June 2020.

1991 Data East version

Gameplay
This machine has the following features:

 2 ramps
 3 bumpers
 3-ball multiball
 Spinning pizza and ramps

Reception 
In Japan, Game Machine listed Teenage Mutant Ninja Turtles on their June 1, 1991 issue as being the second most-successful flipper unit of the year.

2020 Stern version

Overview
Stern created three versions; Pro, Premium and Limited Edition.  

The Limited Edition model is limited to 500 units and features a numbered plaque, custom themed backglass, cabinet artwork and art blades as well as a shaker motor and anti-reflection glass.

References

IPDB listing for ''Teenage Mutant Ninja Turtles

External links
Pinpedia entry for Teenage Mutant Ninja Turtles
 (2020 Stern Pro version)
 (2020 Stern Premium version)
 (2020 Stern Limited Edition version)

Pinball
Pinball machines based on comics
Pinball machines based on films
Pinball machines based on television series
Data East pinball machines
1991 pinball machines
2020 pinball machines
Stern pinball machines